The River Sowe is a river in Warwickshire and West Midlands, England. It is a tributary of the River Avon, and flows into it just south of Stoneleigh about 5 miles (8 km) south of Coventry.

The Sowe rises in Bedworth 5.5 miles (9 km) to the north of Coventry. Its route takes it through Exhall near to Junction 3 of the M6 motorway and the A444 road, to the northern and then the eastern suburbs of Coventry, in particular the districts of Longford, Wood End, Walsgrave, Binley, Willenhall and near the village of Baginton.  Near Baginton the river has a large steep bank on its southern side and the remains of the Roman Lunt Fort have been found at the top of this bank.

There is an established local park called the Sowe Valley Footpath that runs alongside the river for 8½ miles from Hawkesbury Junction Conservation Area to Stonebridge Meadows Local Nature.  It also runs through Wyken Slough Local Nature Reserve, Wyken Croft Nature Park and Stoke Floods Local Nature Reserve.

The grade II-listed Sowe Viaduct carries the Coventry-Rugby railway line across the river.

Crossings
In downstream order from source; listed or notable bridges and A-roads/motorways only:
A444 Bedworthy Bypass
M6 motorway (junction 3 flyover)
A444 road
River is culverted under the Coventry Canal, Coventry to Nuneaton railway line, and an industrial estate
A4600 Ansty Road
Access road to University Hospital Coventry
A4600 Ansty Road
A428 Binley Road
A4082 Allard Way (twice; the road spans a meander)
Sowe Viaduct
A45 Stonebridge Highway
Baginton Bridge (grade II) 
Stoneleigh Bridge (grade II and scheduled monument)

Gallery

References

Rivers of the West Midlands (county)
Rivers of Warwickshire
Rivers of Coventry
1Sowe